Glebe Schoolhouse is a historic one-room school building located near Summerdean, Augusta County, Virginia. It was built in 1830, as a one-room, brick schoolhouse with a gable roof and gable-end chimney. It is the only extant one-room school of brick construction, the oldest documented schoolhouse, and one of the few surviving privately built schoolhouses in Virginia.  The school closed in the early-20th century, and subsequently converted to a private dwelling.

It was listed on the National Register of Historic Places in 1985.

References

One-room schoolhouses in Virginia
School buildings on the National Register of Historic Places in Virginia
School buildings completed in 1830
Schools in Augusta County, Virginia
National Register of Historic Places in Augusta County, Virginia
1830 establishments in Virginia